Pride Sports Football Club is an Indian football club based in Jabalpur, Madhya Pradesh. Pride Sports competed as a member of the I-League 2nd Division, the then second tier (now 3rd) of football in India. They are also eligible to play in Madhya Pradesh Premier League. The club plays their home matches at Ravishankar Shukla Stadium in Jabalpur.

History
Pride Sports FC was founded in Jabalpur with a vision to promote football in the Indian state of Madhya Pradesh. In 2016, the club debuted in the I-League 2nd Division, the second tier of Indian football. They became the second club from Madhya Pradesh to participate in any national level football tournament of India, after Madhya Bharat SC.

In 2016–17 I-League 2nd Division preliminary rounds, Pride Sports finished at the bottom of group C.

Rivalries
Their main rival is Madhya Bharat which is a fellow team from Madhya Pradesh, whom they play the "Madhya Derby".

Kit manufacturers and shirt sponsors

Players

Last registered squad

Managerial record
updated on 28 May 2017

Team records

Seasons

See also
 Football in India
 List of football clubs in India
 I-League Second Division
 Madhya Bharat SC

References

External links
 Pride Sports Football Club at footystats.org

 
Football clubs in Madhya Pradesh
I-League 2nd Division clubs
2016 establishments in Madhya Pradesh
Association football clubs established in 2016
Jabalpur